The Electoral district of City of Sydney was an electorate of the New South Wales Legislative Council.

It was created by the 1843 Electoral Districts Act and initially called the electoral district of Town of Sydney and a first returned two members. With the expansion of the Council in 1851 it elected three members.

In 1856 the unicameral Legislative Council was abolished and replaced with an elected Legislative Assembly and an appointed Legislative Council. The district was represented by the Legislative Assembly electorate of Sydney City.

Members

Election results

1843

1848

1849 by-election
Robert Lowe resigned in November 1849.

1850 by-election
William Bland resigned in June 1850.

1851

1851 by-election
John Lang resigned in November 1851.

1853 by-election
John Lamb resigned in February 1853.

1854 by-election
William Wentworth resigned in April 1854 from the Legislative Council while he went to England to watch over the progress of the Constitution Bill in the British parliament.

1855 by-election
William Thurlow resigned in January 1855.

See also
Members of the New South Wales Legislative Council, 1843–1851 and 1851-1856

References

External links
Hansard NSW Legislative Council

History of New South Wales
Former electoral districts of New South Wales Legislative Council
1843 establishments in Australia
1856 disestablishments in Australia